Domanice  is a settlement in the administrative district of Gmina Damnica, within Słupsk County, Pomeranian Voivodeship, in northern Poland.

References

Villages in Słupsk County